The 2018–19 Chinese Men's Volleyball Super League is the 23rd season of the Chinese Men's Volleyball Super League, the highest professional volleyball league in China. The season began on 22 October 2018 and ended with the Finals on 27 February 2019. Shanghai Golden Age are the defending champions.

On 27 February 2019, Shanghai Golden Age won their 15th Chinese Men's Volleyball Super League title, after defeating Beijing BAIC Motor in the final, 3–0 (3–0, 3–2, 3–0).

Clubs

Clubs and locations

Regular season

First stage

Group A

Updated to match(es) played on 28 October 2018.
Source: Ranking Table Group A

Group B

Updated to match(es) played on 28 October 2018.
Source: Ranking Table Group B

Second stage

Top eight

Updated to match(es) played on 9 January 2019.
Source: Ranking Table Top eight

Bottom six

Updated to match(es) played on 12 December 2018.
Source: Ranking Table Top six

Final stage
 Best-of-five series

Bracket

Third stage

Final four
 (1) Beijing BAIC Motor vs (4) Shandong Sports Lottery

|}(2) Shanghai Golden Age vs (3) Jiangsu|}

Fourth stage
3rd place match
 Best-of-three series|}

Final
 Best-of-five series''

|}

Final standing

References

External links 
 Official website of the Chinese Volleyball Association

League 2018-19
Chinese Volleyball Super League, 2018-19
Chinese Volleyball Super League, 2018-19
Volleyball League, 2018-19
Volleyball League, 2018-19